Scanzano  is a frazione of Sante Marie, in the Province of L'Aquila in the Abruzzo, region of Italy.

Frazioni of Sante Marie